Deadline Torp, also known as Torp-Dramaet, is a TV miniseries co-written by crime author Jo Nesbø based on the true events of the 1994 Torp hostage crisis. It was produced for the Norwegian Broadcasting Corporation. 

It tells the true story of the Torp hostage crisis that took place in Sandefjord, Norway. It began on 28 September 1994 and lasted for two days. Two men from Sweden robbed a bank in a small Norwegian town and a large police hunt was initiated. The robbers eventually took two civilians and two police officers hostages. The following morning at Sandefjord Airport Torp, the hostage drama came to a deadly end when a police chief, for the first time in Norwegian history, gave an order to shoot to kill.

References

NRK original programming
2000s Norwegian television series
Jo Nesbø
Norwegian crime television series
Television shows set in Norway